This is a list of prominent Latvians with Wikipedia articles. It includes:
 persons who were born in the historical territory of what is now Latvia, regardless of ethnicity, citizenship, or time period; and
 persons of Latvian descent regardless of their place of birth or citizenship.

A
 Valerians Abakovskis (1895–1921) – inventor of a propeller-powered railcar, the aerowagon
 Rutanya Alda (Rutanya Alda Skrastiņa, born 1942) – actress (Mommie Dearest, The Deer Hunter)
 Viktor Alksnis (born 1950) – Soviet military officer and Russian communist politician known as "the Black Colonel"
 Juris Alunāns (1832–1864) – writer and philologist
 Ingrīda Andriņa (1944–2015) – actress 
 Iveta Apkalna (born 1976) – organist
 Fricis Apšenieks (1894–1941) – chess player
 Vija Artmane (1929–2008) – actress
 Aspazija, pen-name of Elza Pliekšāne (1865–1943) – poet and playwright
 Gunārs Astra (1931–1988) – dissident, fighter for human rights
 Auseklis, pseudonym of Miķelis Krogzemis (1850–1879) – poet, author and translator of German poets

B
 Ainars Bagatskis (born 1967) – basketball player
 Helmuts Balderis (born 1952) – ice hockey player, forward
 Jānis Balodis (1881–1965) – army officer and politician
 Kārlis Balodis (1864–1931) – economist, financist, statistician and demographist
 Krišjānis Barons (1835–1923) – "the father of Latvian folk songs"; compiled and edited the first publication of Latvian folk-song texts, Latvju Dainas (1894–1915)
 Mikhail Baryshnikov (born 1948) – ballet dancer
 Kārlis Baumanis (1835–1905) – composer, author of the national anthem of the Republic of Latvia "Dievs, svētī Latviju!" ("God Bless Latvia!")
 Vizma Belševica (1931–2005) – author, candidate for the Nobel Prize in Literature
 Eduards Berklavs (1914–2004) – politician, leader of Latvian national-communists
 Krišjānis Berķis (1884–1942) – general
 Dairis Bertāns (born 1989) – basketball player
 Isaiah Berlin (Jesaja Berlins, 1909–1997) – philosopher
 Eduards Bērziņš (1894–1938) – soldier in the Red Army, later head of Dalstroy, the Kolyma forced-labour camps in North-Eastern Siberia
 Yan Karlovich Berzin (1889–1938) Soviet military intelligence officer
 Kaspars Bērziņš (born 1985) – basketball player
 Kārlis Bētiņš (1867–1943) – chess player
 Andris Biedriņš (born 1986) – basketball player
 Gunārs Birkerts (1925–2017) – architect
 Miervaldis Birze (1921–2000) – writer
 Ernests Blanks (1894–1972) – publicist, writer, historian, the first to publicly advocate for Latvia's independence
 Rūdolfs Blaumanis (1863–1908) – writer and playwright
 Himans Blūms (1913–2009) – painter
 Jānis Blūms (born 1982) – basketball player
 Ārons Bogoļubovs (born 1938) – Olympic medalist in judoka
 Mairis Briedis (born 1985) – world boxing champion
 Baiba Broka (born 1973) – actress
 Baiba Broka (born 1975) – lawyer and politician
 Ingūna Butāne (born 1986) – fashion model

C
 Frīdrihs Canders (1887–1933) – pioneer of rocketry and spaceflight
 Valters Caps (1905–2003) – designed first Minox 8 x 11 photo cameras
 Aleksandrs Cauņa (born 1988) – footballer
 Gustavs Celmiņš (1899–1968) – fascist politician, leader of Pērkonkrusts movement
 Vija Celmins (born 1938) – American painter born in Latvia
 Tanhum Cohen-Mintz (1939–2014) – Latvian-born Israeli basketball player

Č
 Māris Čaklais (1940–2003) – poet
 Aleksandrs Čaks (1901–1950) – poet
 Jānis Čakste (1859–1927) – first President of Latvia

D
 Roberts Dambītis (1881–1957) – general and politician
 Jānis Dāliņš (1904–1978) – athlete, race walker
 Emīls Dārziņš (1875–1910) – composer
 Volfgangs Dārziņš (1906–1962) – composer, pianist and music critic
 Kaspars Daugaviņš (born 1988) – ice hockey player
 Jacob Davis (1834–1908) – inventor of denim
 Johans Aleksandrs Heinrihs Klapje de Kolongs (1839–1901) – naval engineer
 Eliass Eliezers Desslers (1892–1953) – Orthodox rabbi, Talmudic scholar, and Jewish philosopher
 Leor Dimant (born 1972) – DJ for the rap metal group Limp Bizkit
 Anatols Dinbergs (1911–1993) – diplomat
 Aleksis Dreimanis (1914–2011) – geologist
 Inga Drozdova (born 1975) – model and actress
 Domenique Dumont – music producer
 Oļģerts Dunkers (1932–1997) – actor and film director
 Christine Dzidrums (born 1971) – author

E
 Mihails Eizenšteins (1867–1921) – architect
 Sergejs Eizenšteins (1898–1948) – film director
 Modris Eksteins (born 1943) – Canadian historian and writer
 Ēriks Ešenvalds (born 1977) – composer
 Andrievs Ezergailis (born 1930) – historian of the Holocaust

F
 Movša Feigins (1908–1950) – chess player
 Gregors Fitelbergs (1879–1953) – conductor, composer and violinist
 Vesels fon Freitāgs-Loringhofens (1899–1944) – colonel and member of the German resistance against German dictator Adolf Hitler
 Laila Freivalds (born 1942) – former Swedish Minister for Foreign Affairs

G
 Inese Galante (born 1954) – opera singer; soprano
 Gints Gabrāns (born 1970) – artist
 Elīna Garanča (born 1976) – opera singer; mezzo-soprano
 Zemgus Girgensons (born 1994) – ice hockey centre
 Kārlis Goppers (1876–1941) – general; founder of Latvian Boy Scouts
 Andrejs Grants (born 1955) – photographer
 Kristers Gudļevskis (born 1992) – ice hockey goaltender
 Ernests Gulbis (born 1988) – tennis player
 Natālija Gulbis (born 1983) – Latvian-descent LPGA golfer
 Pāvels Gumennikovs (born 1986) –  Latvian film director, actor, writer, and producer

Ģ
 Uldis Ģērmanis (1915–1997) – historian; under the alias of Ulafs Jāņsons, a social commentator
 Aivars Ģipslis (1937–2000) – chess player

H
 Moriss Halle (1923–2018) – linguist
 Filips Halsmans (1906–1979) – Latvian-American photographer
 Juris Hartmanis (1928-2022) – computer scientist; Turing Award winner
 Uvis Helmanis (born 1972) – basketball player

I
 Artūrs Irbe (born 1967) – ice hockey player, goalkeeper
 Kārlis Irbītis (1904–1997) – aviation inventor, engineer, designer

J
 Gatis Jahovičs (born 1984) – basketball player
 Mariss Jansons (1943–2019) – conductor
 Inese Jaunzeme (1932–2011) – athlete

K
 Aivars Kalējs (born 1951) – organist, composer
 Konrāds Kalējs (1913–2001) – alleged war criminal
 Sandra Kalniete (born 1952) – politician, diplomat, former Latvia's EU commissioner
 Bruno Kalniņš (1899–1990) – Saeima member, Red Army General
 Imants Kalniņš (born 1941) – composer, politician
 Oskars Kalpaks (1882–1919) – colonel, first Commander of Latvian National Armed Forces
 Kaspars Kambala (born 1978) – basketball player
 Arturs Krišjānis Kariņš (born 1964) – politician, current Prime Minister of Latvia
 Mārtiņš Karsums (born 1986) – ice hockey player
 Reinis Kaudzīte (1839–1920) – writer and journalist
 Renārs Kaupers (born 1974) – musician
 Jēkabs Ketlers (1610–1682) – Duke of the Duchy of Courland and Semigallia
 Gustavs Klucis (1895–1938) – painter and graphic designer
 Aleksandrs Koblencs (1916–1993) – chess player
 Ābrams Izāks Kūks (1864–1935) – chief rabbi, Jewish thinker, statesman, diplomat, mediator and scholar
 Aleksandrs Kovaļevskis (1840–1901) – zoologist
 Ilsa Konrads (born 1944) – Olympic swimmer
 John Konrads (1942–2021) – Olympic swimmer
 Gidons Krēmers (born 1947) – violinist and conductor
 Miķelis Krogzemis (1850–1879) – poet, author and translator of German poets
 Juris Kronbergs (born 1946) – poet, writer, free-lance journalist, translator
 Atis Kronvalds (1837–1875) – teacher and journalist; reformed the Latvian language; organized the first Latvian Song and Dance Festival
 Dainis Kūla (born 1959) – athlete (Olympic gold medal in javelin)
 Alberts Kviesis (1881–1944) – President of Latvia

L
 Aleksandrs Laime (1911–1994) – explorer
 Vilis Lācis (1904–1966) – author and politician
 Ginta Lapiņa (born 1989) – fashion model
 Natālija Lašenova (born 1973) – gymnastics Olympic champion (team)
 Edvards Liedskalniņš (1887–1951) – builder of Coral Castle in Florida; claimed to have discovered the ancient magnetic levitation secrets used to construct the Egyptian pyramids
 Jēkabs Mihaels Reinholds Lencs (1751–1792) – author
 Marija Leiko (1887–1937) – actress
 Māris Liepa (1936–1989) – ballet dancer
 Peggy Lipton  (1946–2019) – Latvian-American actress
 Nikolajs Loskis (1870–1965) – philosopher
 Jānis Lūsis (born 1939) – athlete; Olympic champion

Ļ
 Jevgēnija Ļisicina (born 1942) – organist

M
 Māris Martinsons (born 1960) – film director, producer, screenwriter and film editor 
 Hermanis Matisons (1894–1932) – chess player
 Zenta Mauriņa (1897–1978) – writer, literary scholar, culture philosopher
 Juris Māters (1845–1884) – author, lawyer and journalist; translated laws to Latvian and created the foundation for Latvian law
 Jānis Medenis (1903–1961) – poet
 Arnis Mednis (born 1961) – singer
 Zigfrīds Anna Meierovics (1887–1925) – first Latvian Minister of Foreign Affairs
Mareks Mejeris (born 1991) - basketball player for Hapoel Jerusalem of the Israeli Basketball Premier League
 Alan Melikdjanian (born 1980) – independent filmmaker, YouTuber
 Leo Mihelsons (1887–1978) – artist
 Arnolds Mikelsons (1922–1984) – artist
 Jevgēņijs Millers (1867–1938) – czarist Russian general
 Kārlis Mīlenbahs (1853–1916) – linguist

N
 Arkādijs Naidičs (born 1985) – chess player; now resident in Germany
 Andris Nelsons (born 1978) – conductor, Boston Symphony Orchestra
 Andrievs Niedra (1871–1941) – pastor, writer, prime minister of German puppet government (1919)
 Arons Nimcovičs (1886–1935) – chess player
 Reinis Nitišs (born 1995) – World Rallycross driver
 Fred Norris (born 1955) – radio personality, The Howard Stern Show

O
 Staņislavs Olijars (born 1979) – athlete (European champion in 110m hurdles)
 Jeļena Ostapenko (born 1997) – tennis player (Grand Slam champion)
 Vilhelms Ostvalds (1853–1932) – received the Nobel Prize in Chemistry in 1909 for his work on catalysis, chemical equilibria and reaction velocities
 Elvīra Ozoliņa (born 1939) – athlete (Olympic gold medal in javelin)
 Sandis Ozoliņš (born 1972) – ice hockey player, defense
 Valdemārs Ozoliņš (1896–1973) – composer, conductor
 Auseklis Ozols (born 1941) – artist

P
 Artis Pabriks (born 1966) – Latvian Minister of Foreign Affairs (2007–2007)
 Ināra Petrusēviča (born 1969) – artist
 Kārlis Padegs (1911–1940) – graphic artist, painter
 Marians Pahars (born 1976) – soccer player
 Raimonds Pauls (born 1936) – composer; widely known in Russia
 Lūcija Peka (1912–1991) – artist of the Latvian diaspora
 Konstantīns Pēkšēns (1859-1928) - Art nouveau architect
 Jēkabs Peterss (1886–1938) – revolutionary and Soviet Cheka leader
 Kaspars Petrovs (born 1978) – serial killer
 Vladimirs Petrovs (1907–1943) – chess player
 Oskars Perro (1918–2003) – soldier and writer
 Andris Piebalgs (born 1957) – politician and diplomat; European Commissioner for Energy
 Jānis Pliekšāns (1865–1929) – writer; author of a number of poetry collections
 Juris Podnieks (1950–1992) – film director, producer
 Nikolajs Poļakovs (1900–1974) – circus performer; creator of Coco the Clown
 Jānis Poruks (1871–1911) – writer
 Kristaps Porziņģis (born 1995) – basketball player, New York Knicks
 Rosa von Praunheim (born 1942) – film director, author, painter and gay rights activist
 Sandis Prūsis (born 1965) – athlete, bobsleigh
 Uldis Pūcītis (1937–2000) – actor, director
 Jānis Pujāts (born 1930) – Roman Catholic cardinal
 Andrejs Pumpurs (1841–1901) – poet; author of Latvian national epic Lāčplēsis

R
 Rainis, pseudonym of Jānis Pliekšāns (1865–1929) – poet and playwright
 Dan Rapoport (born 1970) – American financier and philanthropist
 Lauris Reiniks (born 1979) – singer-songwriter, actor and television personality
 Einars Repše (born 1961) – politician
 Lolita Ritmanis (born 1962) – orchestrator, composer
 Iļja Ripss (born 1948) – inventor of the Bible code
 Fricis Rokpelnis (1909–1969) – author
 Markuss Rotkovičs (1903–1970) – abstract expressionist painter
 Elza Rozenberga (1865–1943) – poet, playwright; married to Jānis Pliekšāns
 Juris Rubenis (born 1961) – Lutheran pastor
 Mārtiņš Rubenis (born 1978) – athlete; bronze medalist at the 2006 Winter Olympics in Turin
 Brunis Rubess (1926–2009) – businessman
 Inta Ruka (born 1958) – photographer
 Wolf Ruvinskis (1921–1999) – versatile actor, a memorable face of the Cinema of Mexico

S
 Rudolfs Saulē (1903–1975) – ballet master; performer with the Latvian National Ballet
 Uļjana Semjonova (born 1952) – basketball player
 Haralds Silovs (born 1986) – short track and long track speed skater
 Kārlis Skalbe (1879–1945) – poet
 Kārlis Skrastiņš (1974–2011) – ice hockey player
 Baiba Skride (born 1981) – violinist
 Konstantīns Sokoļskis (1904–1991) – romance and tango singer
 Ksenia Solo (born 1987) – Latvian-Canadian actress
 Serge Sorokko (born 1954) – art dealer and publisher
 Raimonds Staprans (born 1926) – Latvian-American painter
 Jānis Šteinhauers (1705–1779) – industrialist, entrepreneur, and civil rights activist
 Gotthard Friedrich Stender (1714–1796) – first Latvian grammarian
 Līna Šterna (1878–1968) – biologist and social activist
 Roze Stiebra (born 1942) – animator
 Henrijs Stolovs (1901–1971) – stamp dealer
 Jānis Streičs (born 1936) – film director, screenwriter, actor
 Jānis Strēlnieks (born 1989) – basketball player
 Pēteris Stučka (1865–1932) – author, translator, editor, jurist and educator
 Jānis Sudrabkalns (1894–1975) – poet and journalist
 Jevgēņijs Svešņikovs (born 1950) – chess player
 Staņislavs Svjanevičs (1899–1997) – economist and historian

Š
 Viktors Ščerbatihs (born 1974) – athlete, weightlifter
 Pauls Šīmanis (1876–1944) – Baltic German journalist, politician, activist defending and preserving European minority cultures
 Vestards Šimkus (born 1984) – pianist
 Aleksejs Širovs (born 1972) – chess player
 Andris Šķēle (born 1958) – politician; Prime Minister of Latvia
 Armands Šķēle (born 1983) – basketball player
 Ainārs Šlesers (born 1970) – politician, chairman of Latvia First
 Ernests Štālbergs (1883–1958) – architect, ensemble of the Freedom Monument
 Īzaks Nahmans Šteinbergs (1888–1957) – politician, lawyer and author
 Māris Štrombergs (born 1987) – BMX cyclist; gold medal winner at 2008 and 2012 Olympics

T
 Esther Takeuchi (born 1953) – materials scientist and chemical engineer
 Mihails Tāls (1936–1992) – the 8th World Chess Champion
 Jānis Roberts Tilbergs (1880–1972) – painter, sculptor

U
 Guntis Ulmanis (born 1939) – President of Latvia
 Kārlis Ulmanis (1877–1942) – Prime Minister of Latvia; President of Latvia
 Juris Upatnieks  (born 1936) – physicist and inventor; pioneer in the field of holography
 Andrejs Upīts (1877–1970) – poet and writer

V
 Ojārs Vācietis (1933–1983) – writer
 Romāns Vainšteins (born 1973) – cyclist, World Road Champion in 2000
 Krišjānis Valdemārs (1825–1891) – public figure, writer, publicist and economist
 Pauls Valdens (1863–1957) – chemist
 Miķelis Valters (1874–1968) – state official, journalist, diplomat
 Valdis Valters (born 1957) – basketball player
 Aleksandrs Vanags (1918–1986) – footballer
 Jānis Vanags (born 1958) – Lutheran archbishop
 Jūlijs Vanags (1903–1984) – author and translator
 Pēteris Vasks (born 1946) – contemporary composer
 Jukums Vācietis (1873–1938) – first commander of the Soviet Army
 Ojārs Vācietis (1933–1983) – poet
 Kaspars Vecvagars (born 1993) – basketball club BC Žalgiris player
 Eduards Veidenbaums (1867–1892) – poet and translator
 Makss Veinreihs (1893–1969) – linguist
 Ed Viesturs (Edmunds Viesturs, born 1959) – mountaineer
 Igors Vihrovs (born 1978) – gymnast, gold medalist at Sydney Olympics in 2000
 Edvarts Virza (1883–1940) – writer
 Alvis Vītoliņš (1946–1997) – chess master
 Vaira Vīķe-Freiberga (born 1937) – former President of Latvia
 Jāzeps Vītols (1863–1948) – composer
 Māris Verpakovskis (born 1979) – footballer
 Aleksandrs Voitkevičs (1963–2006) – chess player

Z
 Kārlis Zāle (1888–1942) – sculptor; author of the Freedom Monument in Riga
 Juris Zariņš (born 1945) – archaeologist and professor at Missouri State University
 Kārlis Zariņš (Charles Zarine) (1879–1963) – diplomat
 Rihards Zariņš (1869–1939) – graphic artist
 Valdis Zatlers (born 1955) – former President of Latvia
 Elmārs Zemgalis (1923–2014) – chess player
 Gustavs Zemgals (1871–1939) – former President of Latvia 
 Imants Zemzaris (born 1951) – contemporary composer
 Valdis Zeps (1932–1996) – author and linguist; pseudonym Jānis Turbads
 Imants Ziedonis (1933–2013) – poet and folklorist
 Mārtiņš Zīverts (1903–1990) – playwright
 Kaspars Znotiņš (born 1975) – stage and film actor

Ž
 Sergejs Žoltoks (1972–2004) – ice hockey player, forward

See also

 Latvian American

References